Henrietta Christian Wright (1852–1899) was an American children's author who resided in the Old Bridge section of East Brunswick, New Jersey. She was born there on February 18, 1852, died there on December 13, 1899, and buried in the Chestnut Hill Cemetery.

Publishing career
She wrote children's books on literature, history and science. One of her children's books, Children's Stories in American Literature: 1660-1860, covered the lives and works of such great authors as Edgar Allan Poe, William Bryant, Ralph Waldo Emerson, Henry Wadsworth Longfellow, James Russell Lowell, and Oliver Wendell Holmes. First published in 1861, this book was a part of the everyday schooling of young pre-teens. In 1883, the New York publisher White and Stokes published Little Folk in Green written by Wright and illustrated at the age of 16 by Miss Lydia Emmet (1866–1952), who went on to become a noted portrait artist. Wright also produced Children's Stories in English Literature from Taliesin to Shakespeare, in which she introduces traditional songs and literary work by Chaucer, Spenser, Phillip Sidney, and Shakespeare with biographical and historic notes before re-telling their writings in language for children. It was published by Charles Scribner's Sons in 1889.

Selected works

 Little Folk in Green: New Fairy Stories, New York : White and Stokes, 1882
 Children's Stories in American History, Charles Scribner's Sons, 1885
 The Princess Lilliwinkins and Other Stories, New York, Harper & brothers, 1889
 Children's Stories in English Literature from Shakespeare to Tennyson, 1891 C. Scribner's Sons, New York
 Children's Stories of the Great Scientists, New York, C. Scribner's sons, 1888, publ. 1894 Republished by Dodo Press, 2008, paperback
 Children's Stories in English Literature from Taliesin to Shakespeare, New York : Charles Scribner's Sons, 1889
 Children's Stories in American Literature: 1861–1896, Charles Scribner's Sons., New York, NY 1895 Republished by Arden Library, 1978
 American Men of Letters, 1660–1896, London, D. Nutt, 1897
 Children's Stories of American Progress, New York, C. Scribner's sons, ©1886, publ. 1914. Republished by Read Books, paperback, 2010

References

External links
 
 
 
 

1852 births
1899 deaths
19th-century American writers
19th-century American women writers
People from East Brunswick, New Jersey
Writers from New Jersey
Children's non-fiction writers
American children's writers
American women children's writers